The  is the easternmost tectonic unit or terrane of Hokkaidō, Japan. The belt is composed of volcanogenic sediments and volcanic rocks — for the most part, basalt and andesites; these may be remnants of an island arc that took shape over an "east or southeast dipping intraoceanic subduction zone". As dated by potassium–argon geochronology and radiolarians, the oldest sequences are Campanian‐Maastrichtian. The belt has rotated counterclockwise some 15–25° since the Late Cretaceous.

The Nemuro Group is in part overlain by the Middle Eocene , which is in turn overlain by the Upper Eocene to Lower Oligocene .

Nemuro Group
The group includes the following formations, in ascending order:

Urahoro Group
The group includes the following formations, in ascending order:
 
 
 
 
 
 

At the western end, the  correlates with the Beppo, Harutori, and Tenneru Formations.

References

Geology of Japan
Landforms of Hokkaido